Dhak Khati  is a village in Phagwara Tehsil in Kapurthala district of Punjab State, India. The village is administrated by a Sarpanch, who is an elected representative.

Demography 
According to the report published by Census India in 2011, Dhak Khati has 3 houses with the total population of 16 persons of which 11 are male and 5 females. Literacy rate of Dhak Khati is 58.33%, lower than the state average of 75.84%.  The population of children in the age group 0–6 years is 4 which is 25.00% of the total population.  Child sex ratio is approximately 1000, higher than the state average of 846.

Population data

References

External links
  Villages in Kapurthala
 Kapurthala Villages List

Villages in Kapurthala district